Holy Trinity Orthodox Church is an Eastern Orthodox church in Riga, the capital of Latvia. The church is situated in Pārdaugava at the address 2 Meža Street.

References 

Churches in Riga
Eastern Orthodox churches in Latvia